The Djibouti national football team, nicknamed the Riverains de la Mer Rouge ("Shoremen of the Red Sea"), is the national football team of Djibouti. It is controlled by the Djiboutian Football Federation, and is a member of the Confederation of African Football (CAF) and the Union of Arab Football Associations (UAFA). The Djibouti national football team's first win in a full FIFA-sanctioned international match was a 1–0 win vs. Somalia in the first round of the 2010 FIFA World Cup qualification.

History

French Somaliland (1947–1960) 

Djibouti played its first international match under the name French Somaliland, at home against neighbouring Ethiopia on 5 December 1947 and lost 5–0. This was also Ethiopia's debut. The two played again in Djibouti on 1 June 1948 and Ethiopia won 2–1. On 1 May 1949, the fixture was played for the Emperor Cup in Ethiopia, and the host won 6–0. In 1954, Djibouti played Ethiopia three times: a 10–2 away loss on 1 May, a 2–0 home loss on 1 June and a 2–1 home loss the day after. Djibouti did not play a match again until 1960, when it entered a tournament for French-speaking countries held in Madagascar. The team lost 9–2 in the first round to Cameroon on 13 April. This was the squad's last game as French Somaliland.

Djibouti (1977–present) 
After gaining independence in 1977, the team played under the name Djibouti for the first time against Ethiopia in an away match on 27 March 1983 and lost 8–1. The two played again two days later with Ethiopia again victorious, by 4–2. After a third friendly against Ethiopia, a 2–0 home defeat on 23 March 1984, Djibouti entered a tournament in Ethiopia against the host and Zimbabwe. They lost 2–0 to Ethiopia on 3 June and then 3–1 to Zimbabwe on 7 June.

Djibouti's first appearance at the CECAFA Cup, a local competition for nations in East and Central Africa, was in Kenya in 1994. These were its first matches since defeating South Yemen in 1988. The Djibouti squad lost 4–1 to the hosts on 28 November, 2–1 to Somalia on 1 December, and 3–0 to Tanzania on 3 December. Djibouti did not advance to the next round.

After the 1994 CECAFA Cup, Djibouti did not play a match until the qualification campaign for the 1998 African Cup of Nations in Burkina Faso. They were drawn in a two-legged qualifier against Kenya, and lost the first leg 3–0 away on 31 July 1998. The second leg at home was lost 9–1 on 15 August and Kenya went through 12–1 on aggregate.

In 1998, Djibouti became a member of the Union of Arab Football Associations (UAFA). The football squad has since participated in the Pan Arab Games, a regional multi-sport event held between nations from the Arab World.

Djibouti entered its first ever World Cup qualification in an attempt to reach the 2002 FIFA World Cup in South Korea and Japan. In Pool D of the first round of African qualification, it was drawn against the DR Congo in a two-legged qualifying preliminary. Djibouti hosted the first leg at Stade du Ville in Djibouti on 7 April 2000, drawing the match 1–1 before a crowd of 2,700 fans. The squad lost the second leg 9–1 away at the Stade des Martyrs in Kinshasa and the DR Congo advanced 10–2 on aggregate.

Djibouti has never played in the African Cup of Nations, with the team regularly withdrawing or not entering for financial reasons.

Prior to their four preliminary qualifiers in late 2019, Djibouti had 2 wins, 3 draws and 55 defeats from 60 competitive matches. However, a number of new players were called up and results finally improved. First, in the 2022 FIFA World Cup qualification, Djibouti beat Eswatini 2–1 at home and drew 0–0 in Manzini to advance to the second round for the first time since the 2010 qualifying when they beat Somalia 1-0 (2–1 on aggregate). This was a massive improvement from the previous edition when Djibouti had also played Eswatini and lost 8–1 on aggregate. One month later, Djibouti played two 1–1 draws against Gambia in the 2021 Africa Cup of Nations qualification preliminary round, only losing the tie on penalties.

Results and fixtures

2022

Coaches

Players

Current squad
The following players were selected for the 2023 Africa Cup of Nations qualification match against South Sudan on 23 and 27 March 2022 respectively.

Caps and goals are correct as of 27 March 2022, after the match against South Sudan.

Recent call-ups
The following footballers were part of a national selection in the past 12 months, but are not part of the current squad.

Player records

Players in bold are still active with Djibouti.

Most appearances

Top goalscorers

Competition records

FIFA World Cup

Olympic Games

Football at the Summer Olympics has been an under-23 tournament since the 1992 edition.

Africa Cup of Nations

All-Africa Games

 Prior to the Cairo 1991 campaign, the Football at the All-Africa Games was open to full senior national teams.

African Nations Championship

CECAFA Cup

FIFA Arab Cup

 The 2009 edition was cancelled during qualification.

Pan Arab Games

See also
French Somaliland national football team
Djibouti national football team results
Football in Djibouti
Djiboutian Football Federation
Djibouti Premier League
Djibouti Cup
Stade du Ville

References

External links

 Djibouti at FIFA.com
 Djibouti at National-Football-Teams.com.

 
African national association football teams